James Clayton Barr  (1855 – 29 March 1937) was a Senior Commodore of the Cunard line.

Biography
Born in Burnley, Barr first went to sea in 1877 and served mainly in the South American trade. During the Boer War, he was in command of the Catalonia, requisitioned by the Admiralty and employed as a floating prison camp for captured Boers. In October 1913, while eastward bound, Barr responded to a distress call from the SS Volturno to pick up survivors.

On 7 August 1914, Carmania was commissioned into the Royal Navy as an auxiliary cruiser under the command of Captain Noel Grant, R.N. Captain Barr was retained as navigator and advisor, with the acting rank of Commander, Royal Naval Reserve.

On 14 September 1914, while at sea in the South Atlantic, Carmania encountered and sank the German auxiliary cruiser , an armed merchant cruiser of the Imperial German Navy under the command of Korvettenkapitän Julius Wirth. As a result of that successful action, Barr was subsequently invested as a Commander of the Order of the Bath and was Mentioned in Despatches.

He retired from Cunard later that year, and died on 29 March 1937, at the age of 82.

References

External links
James Clayton Barr grave at Flickr

Companions of the Order of the Bath
1855 births
1937 deaths
Ship captains of the Cunard Line
British Merchant Navy officers
Steamship captains
Royal Naval Reserve personnel